The 2003 All Japan Grand Touring Car Championship was the eleventh season of Japan Automobile Federation GT premiere racing. It was marked as well as the twenty-first season of a JAF-sanctioned sports car racing championship dating back to the All Japan Sports Prototype Championship. The GT500 class champions of 2003 were the #23 Xanavi NISMO Nissan Skyline GT-R team driven by Satoshi Motoyama and Michael Krumm and the GT300 class champions were the #3 Hasemi Motorsports Nissan Fairlady Z driven by Masataka Yanagida and Mitsuhiro Kinoshita, neither of which had won a single race during the course of the season.

The 2003 season saw the introduction of a comprehensive overhaul of the series' vehicle regulations. Manufacturers could now cut away the production vehicle's mainframe and replace the front and rear structures with pipe frame structures, which had also allowed for further suspension development. The engine could now be mounted freely in any position or any orientation, and the transmission could now be mounted freely in any position, allowing for the introduction of transaxle units. The size of the rear diffuser was reduced, and the underbody of the car had to be fitted with a flat bottom floor.

Toyota had fitted their GT500 Supra with a 5.2 litre version of the naturally-aspirated 3UZ-FE V8 engine to replace the four-cylinder 3S-GTE. Honda retained the 3.5 litre C32B V6 engine, which was now mounted longitudinally behind the cockpit. Nissan changed from the RB26DETT inline-six cylinder engine to the VQ30DETT V6 engine in the middle of 2002, and retained the lighter aluminium-block engine into 2003.

Drivers and teams

GT500

Schedule

 Due to the SARS outbreak, round 4 of the championship, which was planned to be held at the Sepang Circuit on June 20 and 21, was cancelled and later replaced by a round at Fuji Speedway. The replacement Fuji round featured a unique format of two heat races, each featuring a sprint race for one of the team's drivers. The combined results of both heats would determine the overall winner of the round.

Season results

Standings

GT500 class

Drivers' standings
Scoring system

Teams' standings
For teams that entered multiple cars, only the best result from each round counted towards the teams' championship.

GT300 class (Top 5)

Drivers

References

External links
 Super GT/JGTC official race archive 
 2003 season results

Super GT seasons
JGTC